Allothrombium is a genus of mites belonging to the family Trombidiidae.

Species 
The following species are accepted in the genus Allothrombium:

 Allothrombium adustum
 Allothrombium amiraeli
 Allothrombium angulatum
 Allothrombium athleticum
 Allothrombium chanaanense
 Allothrombium cincindelae
 Allothrombium clavatum
 Allothrombium crassicomum
 Allothrombium delamarei
 Allothrombium dipterae
 Allothrombium epiphyllus
 Allothrombium franklinimuelleri
 Allothrombium fuligineum
 Allothrombium gracile
 Allothrombium guttatum
 Allothrombium incarnatum
 Allothrombium insigne
 Allothrombium lawrencei
 Allothrombium lerouxi
 Allothrombium meridionale
 Allothrombium minutum
 Allothrombium mitchelli
 Allothrombium monochaetum
 Allothrombium monspessulanum
 Allothrombium mossi
 Allothrombium muscaparasiticae
 Allothrombium neapolitanum
 Allothrombium ornatum
 Allothrombium ovatum
 Allothrombium parvulum
 Allothrombium parvum
 Allothrombium pergrande
 Allothrombium polikarpi
 Allothrombium pulvinum
 Allothrombium reinholdi
 Allothrombium sericoideum
 Allothrombium shirazicum
 Allothrombium sicilianum
 Allothrombium simoni
 Allothrombium strigosum
 Allothrombium subtile
 Allothrombium tarsolatum
 Allothrombium tenuipes
 Allothrombium triticium
 Allothrombium trouessarti
 Allothrombium tuberculatum
 Allothrombium ursinum
 Allothrombium watanabei
 Allothrombium willmanni
 Allothrombium wolffi
 Allothrombium wolmari

References

Further reading 

 Haitlinger, R. "New records of mites (Acari: Prostigmata: Erythraeidae, Eutrombidiiddae, Microtrombidiidae, Podothrombiidae, Trombidiidae) from Bulgaria, Macedonia and Romania." Zeszyty Naukowe Uniwersytetu Przyrodniczego we Wrocławiu-Biologia i Hodowla Zwierzat 58.572 (2009): 49–60.
 Wohltmann, Andreas, and Joanna Makol. "A redescription of Allothrombium meridionale Berlese, 1910 (Acari: Trombidiformes: Trombidioidea) with notes on biology and developmental malformations." Annales Zoologici. Vol. 59. No. 3. Museum and Institute of Zoology, Polish Academy of Sciences, 2009.

Trombidiformes
Arachnids of Europe
Animals described in 1903